Michalin may refer to the following places:
Michalin, Aleksandrów County in Kuyavian-Pomeranian Voivodeship (north-central Poland)
Michalin, Nakło County in Kuyavian-Pomeranian Voivodeship (north-central Poland)
Michalin (Gąsiory) in Masovian Voivodeship (east-central Poland)
Michalin (Janówek) in Masovian Voivodeship (east-central Poland)
Michalin, Wyszków County in Masovian Voivodeship (east-central Poland)
Michalin, Zwoleń County in Masovian Voivodeship (east-central Poland)
Michalin, Żyrardów County in Masovian Voivodeship (east-central Poland)
Michalin, Pomeranian Voivodeship (north Poland)